9th Visual Effects Society Awards
February 1, 2011

Best Visual Effects in a Visual Effects Driven Motion Picture:
Inception

The 9th Visual Effects Society Awards, held on February 1, 2011 at the Beverly Hilton Hotel in Los Angeles, honored the best visual effects in film and television of 2010. The show was hosted by Patton Oswalt and broadcast, in an edited version, on the ReelzChannel on February 19, 2011.

Winners and nominees
(winners in bold)

Honorary Awards
Lifetime Achievement Award:
Ray Harryhausen
VES Visionary Award:
Christopher Nolan

Film

Television

Other categories

References

External links
 Visual Effects Society

2010
Visual Effects Society Awards
Visual Effects Society Awards
Visual Effects Society Awards
Visual Effects Society Awards
Visual Effects Society Awards